Iquique Cove is a small,  wide cove indenting for  the east coast of Discovery Bay, Greenwich Island in the South Shetland Islands, Antarctica.  Iquique Cove is sheltered on the northwest by Guesalaga Peninsula, and the small González Island is situated on the south side of the cove's entrance.  The cove is used by ships servicing the Chilean Antarctic base Arturo Prat.

Iquique Cove was charted and named by the 1947 Chilean Antarctic Expedition after the naval frigate Iquique, with González Island named after Ernesto González, captain of the Iquique on that expedition.

Location

See also 
 Composite Antarctic Gazetteer
 List of Antarctic islands south of 60° S
 SCAR
 Territorial claims in Antarctica

Maps
 L.L. Ivanov et al. Antarctica: Livingston Island and Greenwich Island, South Shetland Islands. Scale 1:100000 topographic map. Sofia: Antarctic Place-names Commission of Bulgaria, 2005.
 L.L. Ivanov. Antarctica: Livingston Island and Greenwich, Robert, Snow and Smith Islands. Scale 1:120000 topographic map.  Troyan: Manfred Wörner Foundation, 2009.

References 
 SCAR Composite Antarctic Gazetteer.

Coves of Greenwich Island